The 21st Annual GMA Dove Awards were held on April 5, 1990, recognizing accomplishments of musicians for the year 1989. The show was held at the Tennessee Performing Arts Center in Nashville, Tennessee, and was hosted by Clifton Davis and Sandi Patty.

Award recipients
Song of the Year
"Thank You"; Ray Boltz; Gaither Music, Shepherd Boy Music (ASCAP)
Songwriter of the Year
Steven Curtis Chapman
Male Vocalist of the Year
Steven Curtis Chapman
Female Vocalist of the Year
Sandi Patty
Group of the Year
Bebe & Cece Winans
Artist of the Year
Steven Curtis Chapman
New Artist of the Year
David Mullen
Southern Gospel Album of the Year
I Just Started Living; The Cathedrals; Lari Goss; Homeland
Southern Gospel Recorded Song of the Year
"I Can See The Hand Of God"; The Cathedrals; Steven Curtis Chapman, Jim Chapman III
Inspirational Album of the Year
The Mission; Steve Green; Greg Nelson; Sparrow
Inspirational Recorded Song of the Year
"His Strength Is Perfect"; Steven Curtis Chapman; Steven Curtis Chapman, Jerry Salley; Sparrow
Pop/Contemporary Album of the Year
Heaven; BeBe and CeCe Winans; Keith Thomas; Sparrow
Pop/Contemporary Recorded Song of the Year
"Heaven"; BeBe & CeCe Winans; Keith Thomas, Benjamin Winans; Sparrow
Contemporary Gospel Album of the Year 
Will You Be Ready; Commissioned; Fred Hammond, Michael Brooks; Light
Contemporary Gospel Recorded Song of the Year
"With My Whole Heart"; BeBe & CeCe Winans; Patrick Henderson, Louis Brown III; Sparrow
Traditional Gospel Album of the Year
Saints in Praise; West Angeles Church Of God In Christ Mass Choir; Patrick Henderson; Sparrow
Traditional Gospel Recorded Song of the Year
"Wonderful"; Beau Williams; Virginia Davis, Theodore Fry
Country Album of the Year
Heirloom; Heirloom; Michael Sykes, Trent Hemphill; Benson
Country Recorded Song of the Year
"'Tis So Sweet to Trust in Jesus"; Amy Grant; Public Domain; Word
Rock Album of the Year
The Way Home; Russ Taff; Russ Taff, James Hollihan ; Myrrh
Rock Recorded Song of the Year
"The River Unbroken"; Russ Taff; Darryl Brown, David Batteau; Myrrh
Hard Music Album of the Year
Triumphant Return; Whitecross; Rex Carroll, Joey Powers; Pure Metal
Hard Music Recorded Song of the Year
"In Your Face"; Shout ; Ken Tamplin ; Intense
Instrumental Album of the Year
One of Several Possible Musiks; Kerry Livgren; Kerry Livgren; Sparrow
Praise and Worship Album of the Year
Our Hymns; Various Artists; Various Producers; Word
Children's Music Album of the Year
Sandi Patti and the Friendship Company; Sandi Patti; Greg Nelson, Sandi Patti; Word
Musical Album
Friends Forever Part II; Billy Sprague; Jim Weber, Nan Gurley, Billy Sprague;
Choral Collection Album
The Acapella Collection; Greg Nelson Singers; Greg Nelson; Wordsong
Short Form Music Video of the Year
"I Miss The Way"; Michael W. Smith; Stephen Yake, producer and director; Reunion
Long Form Music Video of the Year
On Fire; Petra; Stephen Yake, director; Star Song
Recorded Music Packaging of the Year
Buddy Jackson, Mark Tucker; Petra Praise: The Rock Cries Out Petra

References

External links
 https://doveawards.com/awards/past-winners/

GMA Dove Awards
1990 music awards
1990 in American music
1990 in Tennessee
GMA